Transcription into Chinese characters is the use of traditional or simplified Chinese characters to phonetically transcribe the sound of terms and names of foreign words to the Chinese language. Transcription is distinct from translation into Chinese whereby the meaning of a foreign word is communicated in Chinese. Since, in mainland China and often in Taiwan, Hanyu Pinyin is now used to transcribe Chinese into a modified Latin alphabet and since English classes are now standard in most secondary schools, it is increasingly common to see foreign names and terms left in their original form in Chinese texts. However, for mass media and marketing within China and for non-European languages, particularly those of the Chinese minorities, transcription into characters remains very common.

Despite the importance of Cantonese and other southern coastal varieties of Chinese to foreign contact during the 19th century (as seen, for instance, in the number of Cantonese loanwords in English), the northern capital dialect has been formally sanctioned within the country for centuries. This status continued under the Republic, which retained the importance of the "National Language" ( Guóyǔ) despite moving its capital to Nanking, Chungking, and Taipei, none of which natively spoke it. Similarly, "Standard Chinese" ( Pǔtōnghuà) has been mandatory for most media and education throughout the People's Republic of China since 1956. Except for a handful of traditional exceptions, modern transcription therefore uses the standardized Mandarin pronunciations exclusively.

Official standards
Modern Han Chinese consists of about 412 syllables in 5 tones, so homophones abound and most non-Han words have multiple possible transcriptions. This is particularly true since Chinese is written as monosyllabic logograms, and consonant clusters foreign to Chinese must be broken into their constituent sounds (or omitted), despite being thought of as a single unit in their original language. Since there are so many characters to choose from when transcribing a word, a translator can manipulate the transcription to add additional meaning.

In the People's Republic of China, the process has been standardized by the Proper Names and Translation Service of the state-run Xinhua News Agency. Xinhua publishes an official reference guide, the Names of the World's Peoples: a Comprehensive Dictionary of Names in Roman-Chinese ( Shìjiè Rénmíng Fānyì Dà Cídiǎn), which controls most transcription for official media and publication in mainland China. As the name implies, the work consists of a dictionary of common names. It also includes transcription tables for names and terms which are not included. The English table is reproduced below; those for a number of other languages are available on the Chinese Wikipedia.

The Basic Laws of the Hong Kong (article) and Macau (article) Special Administrative Regions provide that "Chinese" will be the official languages of those territories, in addition to English and Portuguese, respectively, leaving ambiguous the relative preference for Cantonese and Mandarin. In practice, transcriptions based on both Cantonese and Mandarin pronunciations have been used.

In Singapore, transcription standards are established by the Translation Standardisation Committee for the Chinese Media and in 2014 was moved to National Translation Committee (NTC) of the Ministry of Communication and Information. In Malaysia, transcription/translation standards are established by Chinese Language Standardisation Council of Malaysia.

Increasingly, other countries are setting their own official standards for Chinese transcription and do not necessarily follow Xinhua's versions, just as Xinhua's version differs from Wade–Giles and other international standards. For example, the United States embassy in China recommends rendering "Obama" as  Ōubāmǎ, while Xinhua uses  Àobāmǎ.

History
Transcription of foreign terms may date to the earliest surviving written records in China, the Shang oracle bones. As the Huaxia spread from their initial settlements near the confluence of the Wei and Yellow rivers, they were surrounded on all sides by other peoples. The Chinese characters developed to describe them may have originally transcribed local names, such as the proposed connection between the original "Eastern Yi" people and an Austroasiatic word for "sea". However, the tendency within China was to fit new groups into the existing structure, so that, for example, "Yi" eventually became a word for any "barbarian" and the name "Yue" ( & ), originally applied to a people northwest of the Shang, was later applied to a people south of the Yangtze and then to many cultures as far south as Vietnam. Interaction with the states of Chu, Wu, and Yue during the Spring and Autumn and Warring States periods of the later Zhou brings the first certain evidence of transcription: most famously, the word jiāng, originally krong, derives from the Austroasiatic word for "river".

Besides proper names, a small number of loanwords also found their way into Chinese during the Han dynasty after Zhang Qian's exploration of the Western Regions. The Western Han also saw Liu Xiang's transcription and translation of the "Song of the Yue Boatman" in his Garden of Stories. Some scholars have tried to use it to reconstruct an original version of the otherwise unrecorded language of the Yangtze's Yue people before their incorporation into the Han.

The expansion of Buddhism within China during the later Han and Three Kingdoms period required the transcription of a great many Sanskrit and Pali terms. According to the Song-era scholar Zhou Dunyi, the monk and translator Xuanzang (of Journey to the West fame) handed down guidelines of "Five Kinds of Words Not to Translate". He directed that transcription should be used instead of translation when the words are:
Arcane, such as incantations
Polysemous
Not found in China
Traditionally transcribed, not translated
Lofty and subtle, which a translation might devalue or obscure
These ancient transcription into Chinese characters provide clues to the reconstruction of Middle Chinese. In historical Chinese phonology, this information is called duìyīn; in Western Sinology, Baron Alexander von Staël-Holstein was the first to emphasize its importance in reconstructing the sounds of Middle Chinese. The transcriptions made during the Tang dynasty are particularly valuable, as the then-popular Tantra sect required its mantras to be rendered very carefully into Chinese characters, since they were thought to lose their efficacy if their exact sounds were not properly uttered.

The History of Liao contains a list of Khitan words phonetically transcribed with Chinese characters. The History of Jin contains a list of Jurchen words phonetically transcribed with Chinese characters. In the History of Yuan, Mongol names were phonetically transcribed in Chinese characters.

In the Ming dynasty, the Chinese government's Bureau of Translators ( Sìyí Guǎn) and the Bureau of Interpreters ( Huìtóng Guǎn) published bilingual dictionaries/vocabularies of foreign languages like the Bureau of Translators' multilingual dictionary ( Huá-Yí yìyǔ, 'Sino-Barbarian Dictionary'), using Chinese characters to phonetically transcribe the words of the foreign languages such as Jurchen, Korean, Japanese, Ryukyuan, Mongolian, Old Uyghur, Vietnamese, Cham, Dai, Thai, Burmese, Khmer, Persian, Tibetan, Malay, Javanese, Acehnese, and Sanskrit.

During the Qing dynasty some bilingual Chinese-Manchu dictionaries had the Manchu words phonetically transcribed with Chinese characters. The book  ("Imperially-Published Revised and Enlarged mirror of Qing") in Manchu and Chinese, used both Manchu script to transcribe Chinese words and Chinese characters to transcribe Manchu words with fanqie.

As part of the promotion of Kaozheng studies in the philological field, Qianlong decided that the Chinese character transcriptions of names and words of the Khitan language in the History of Liao, the Jurchen language in the History of Jin, and the Mongolian language in the History of Yuan were not phonetically accurate and true to the original pronunciation. The histories were in fact hastily compiled and suffered from inaccurate and inconsistent phonetic transcriptions of the same names. He ordered the "Imperial Liao Jin Yuan Three Histories National Language Explanation" ( Qīndìng Liáo Jīn Yuán sān shǐ guóyǔjiě) project to "correct" the Chinese character transcriptions by referring to the contemporaneous descendants of those languages. Qianlong identified the Solon language with the Khitan, the Manchu language with the Jurchen, and the Mongolian language with the Mongolian. Solon, Mongolian, and Manchu speakers were consulted with on the "correct" pronunciations of the names and words and their Chinese transcriptions were accordingly changed. However the Khitan language has now been found by modern linguists to be a Mongolic language and is unrelated to the Solon language. The project was part of the Siku Quanshu. Qianlong also promulgated a theory that the Daur people were descended from a Khitan clan, changing the Khitan clan name  Dàhè, found in the History of Liao, to  Dáhū'ěr. The Chinese transcription of the Manchu clan name Niohuru  (Niǔhùlù) was edited and inserted in place of the Jurchen clan name  (Nǚxīliè).

"2. A learned committee, consisting of Chinese, Manchus, Mongols, western Mohammedans, etc. was appointed by the emperor K'ien-lung to revise the Yüan shi, and especially the foreign names of men, places etc. occurring so frequently in that book. These savants in their reformatory zeal, proceeded on the idea, that all the proper names had been incorrectly rendered in the official documents of the Mongols, and had to be changed. They pronounced the same verdict with respect to the histories of the Liao and the Kin. Thus in the new editions of the histories of the Liao, Kin and Yüan, all the original proper names without exception disappeared, and were replaced by names of a new invention, which generally have little resemblance to the original. For further particulars, compare my Notes on Chinese Mediaeval Travellers, p. 58, note 1. By this way of corrupting the names of the original historios, which have generally rendered foreign sounds as correctly as the Chinese language permits, the K'ien-lung editions of these works have become completely unserviceable for historical and geographical investigations. K'ien-lung was very proud of the happy idea of metamorphosing the ancient proper names, and issued an edict, that in future no Chinese scholar should dare to use the ancient names.

After the three histories had been corrupted, K'ien-lung ordered the same committee to explain the meanings of the new names; and this gave rise to a new work entitled:  Liao kin yüan shi yü kai, or "Explanation of words (proper names) found in the histories of the Liao, Kin and Yüan." In this vocabulary, all the names of men, countries, places, mountains, rivers etc.—of the three histories have been systematically arranged, but according to the new spelling. The original spelling of the name however is always given, and the chapters are indicated where the name occurs. This renders the vocabulary very useful for reference, and we may lay aside the fact, that the principal object in view of the learned committee, was the absurd explanation of the meaning of the newly-invented names. I may give a few examples of the sagacity these savants displayed in their etymological commentaries. The city of Derbend (the name means "gate" in Persian), situated on the western shore of the Caspian sea, is mentioned in the Yuan shi, as a city of Persia, and the name is written  Da-r-ban. The committee changed the name into  Du-r-ben, and explain that durben in Mongol means, "four." The name of Bardaa, a city of Armenia, is rendered in the original Yuan shi by  Ba-r-da-a. The committee will have the name to be  Ba-le-t'a-ha, and comment that this name in Manchu means "the neck part of a sable skin." By  Bie-shi-ba-li in theuncorrupted Yuan shi, Bishbalik is to be understood. The meaning of this name in Turkish, is " Five cities," and the term  Wu-ch'eng, meaning also "Five cities," occurs repeatedly in the Yuan shi, as a synonym of Bie-shi-ba-li. The committee however transformed the name into  Ba-shi-bo-li, and state that Ba-shi in the language of the Mohammedans means "head" and bo-li "kidneys."

The most recent edition of the Yüan shi (also with corrupted proper names) is dated 1824, but Archimandrite Palladius has noticed that it was only finished about twenty years later. This edition is not difficult of purchase, and I fancy it is the only edition of the Yuan shi found in European libraries. The numerous translations from the "Mongol history," found in Pauthier's M. Polo, have all been made from this corrupted text. At the time Klaproth and Rémusat wrote, the Yuan shi was unknown in Europe, and it seems, that even the old Catholic missionaries in Peking had not seen it. The old sinologues knew only an extract of the great "Mongol History"." - E. Bretschneider, Notices of the Mediæval Geography and History of Central and Western Asia, pp. 5-6.

Marshall Broomhall commented that Though a great soldier and a great litterateur, K'ien-lung did not escape some serious errors. At one time he appointed a learned committee of Chinese, Manchus, Mongols, and Western Mohammedans to revise the foreign names of men and places which occur in the Yüan Records. So unscientific was this work that the K'ien-lung editions of the Liao, Kin, and Yüan histories are practically useless. The title Kalif rendered Ha-li-fu was changed by the Committee into Farkha and is explained as being "a village in Manchuria."

Transcriptions of English in Chinese characters were used in a book to learn English dating to 1860 in the reign of the Xianfeng Emperor. During the late 19th century, when Western ideas and products flooded China, transcriptions mushroomed. They include not only transcriptions of proper nouns but also those of common nouns for new products. The influence was particularly marked in dialects near the major ports, like Shanghainese. Many of these phonemic loans proved to be fads, however, and popular usage and linguistic reformers subsequently favored calques or neologisms in their place.

Sound and meaning

A transcription into Chinese characters can sometimes be a phono-semantic matching, i.e. it reflects both the sound and the meaning of the transcribed word. For example, "Modern Standard Chinese  shēngnà "sonar", uses the characters  shēng "sound" and  nà "receive, accept".  shēng is a phonetically imperfect rendering of the English initial syllable.

Belarus (lit. "White Russia") is transcribed in Chinese as  Bái'éluósī, with  bái ("white") and  Éluósī ("Russia") preserving the meaning of the original name. Similarly, the common ending -va in Russian female surnames is usually transcribed as  wā, meaning "baby" or "girl", and the corresponding masculine suffix -[o]v is rendered as  fū, meaning "man". More recently, one translation of World Wide Web is / Wànwéi Wǎng, meaning "myriad-dimensional net". Sometimes the transcription reflects chengyu or other Chinese sayings and idioms. For example, the Beatles are known in Mainland China as / Pītóushì, "the mop-headed", and in Taiwan and Hong Kong, / Pītóusì, "the mop-head four", reflecting the chengyu / pītóu sànfǎ concerning disheveled hair. They can also reflect subjective opinions or advertising. Esperanto, now known as "the international language" or literally "language of the world" (/ Shìjièyǔ), was first introduced to China as / Àisībùnándú, meaning "[We] love this [because it's] not difficult to read".

Given that a Chinese neologism can be a phono-semantic matching (i.e. in accordance with both the meaning and the sound of the foreign lexical item), an "innocent" transcription may be unwittingly interpreted as reflecting the meaning of the original. During the Qing dynasty, some Chinese scholars were unhappy to find China was located on a continent called / Yàxìyà, i.e. Asia, as / means "secondary" and / "small", believing that the Europeans were deliberately belittling the East. The ancient Japanese, or the Wa people were upset by their name being represented by the character 倭 wō ("small, short, servile") by the Chinese, and replaced it with 和 hé ("peace, harmony"). Modern Africans have accused the Chinese of racism, as "Africa" is written as  Fēizhōu ("negative, wrong continent") in Chinese. Whether these accusations were justified is controversial.

Cultural differences and personal preference about negative meaning is subjective. However, some translations are generally held to be inappropriate and are usually not used in today's transcriptions:

Mozambique as / Mòsānbígěi, with  meaning "nose" and  "three noses". Today the country is more often transcribed as  Mòsāngbǐkè.
Aberdeen is a common name for places and people, rendered as  Yābādiàn, with / meaning duck. However a place in Hong Kong, Aberdeen Harbour, was originally called  Xiānggǎngzǐ, meaning "Hong Kong minor"; that is now the official name, but  is still used colloquially. Moreover, today the place is more often transcribed as  Ābódīng.

A street in Macau is called Avenida do Conselheiro Ferreira de Almeida, after the official Ferreira de Almeida. Ferreira was transcribed as  Féilìlǎ, as shown on the name of the street, with  meaning "fat" (adj.).
A street in Macau is called Avenida de Demetrio Cinatti. It has been transcribed as  Diēměidiāo Shīnádì dà mǎlù, with  diāo meaning cunning or wicked.

According to Ghil'ad Zuckermann, phono-semantic matching in Chinese is common in four semantic domains: brand names, computer jargon, technological terms and toponyms.

Some transcriptions are meant to have, or happen to have, positive connotations:
United Kingdom is called / Yīngguó, literally "hero country". The first character, is abbreviated from  Yīngjílì, the early Chinese transcription of "English", but subsequently applied to the UK after it was formed from the union of England and Scotland.
Germany is abbreviated as / Déguó, literally "moral country". The first character, is abbreviated from  Déyìzhì (the Chinese transcription of "Deutsch", the German word for "German").
United States of America is abbreviated / Měiguó, literally "beautiful country". It is abbreviated from  Měilìjiān Hézhòngguó,  being an early phonetic transcription of "America".
Philippines as / Fēilǜbīn through transliteration. However Filipino-Chinese in the Philippines uses  Fēiguó meaning "Fragrant Lands".
Athens as  Yǎdiǎn, literally "elegant" and "classical".
Champs-Élysées as / Xiāngxièlìshè, meaning "fragrant pavilion (and) beautiful house".
Dublin as  Dūbólín, meaning "cypress forest capital".
Firenze as  Fěilěngcuì (by the poet Xu Zhimo),  meaning "jadeite" and  "cold". Today the city is usually known as / Fóluólúnsà or  Fóluólúnsī, transcriptions based on the Anglo-French Florence rather than the endonym.
Fontainebleau as / Fēngdānbáilù, meaning "red maple (and) white dew".
Ithaca as / Qǐsèjiā, literally "gorgeous colour wonderful".
Yosemite as / Yōushānměidì (also / Yōuxiānměidì, / Yōushèngměidì, / Yōushīměidì, or / Yōushèngměidì), meaning "elegant mountain / excellent and holy / elegant poem / superior (and) beautiful land".
Champagne as / xiāngbīn, meaning "fragrant areca".

Foreign companies are able to choose representations of their names which serve advertising purposes:
Coca-Cola as / Kěkǒu Kělè, meaning "delicious (and) fun".
Revlon as / Lùhuánóng, literally "revealing bright spring dew", excerpted from Li Bai's A Song of Pure Happiness.
Sheraton Hotels as / Xǐláidēng, "love to visit".
Best Buy as / Bǎisīmǎi, "buy (after) thinking a hundred times".
Subway restaurants as / Sàibǎiwèi, "competing (with) a hundred tastes".
IKEA as  Yíjiā, "suitable/proper for a home".
Costco as  Hǎoshìduō, "market of many great things".
Duolingo as / Duōlínguó, "multiple neighboring countries".
Kentucky Fried Chicken (KFC) as  Kěndéjī, "agree to (a) virtuous foundation".
McDonald's as / Màidāngláo, "wheat serve as labor". The name was also chosen because it represented a "well-known local street", MacDonnell Road, with  meaning 'Road', in Hong Kong, which was the first Chinese speaking territory where a McDonald's restaurant opened (in 1975).
BMW as / Bǎomǎ, meaning "prize horse", sounding like its colloquial name "Beamer".
Pizza Hut as / Bìshèngkè, "the guest must win".
Bing as / Bìyìng, "must respond".
Wikipedia is / Wéijī Bǎikē, meaning "Wiki Encyclopedia". The name can be interpreted as "the encyclopedia that connects the fundamental knowledge of humanity".

Regional differences
Mainland China, Singapore and Malaysia use simplified characters in its transcriptions, while Taiwan, Hong Kong and Macau typically use traditional characters. In addition, transcriptions used in Chinese speaking regions sometimes differ from official transcriptions. For example "Hawaii" ( Hāwǎyī) is rendered as  Xiàwēiyí in most Chinese-language media while New Zealand ( Xīnxīlán) is transcribed by Taiwan media as  Niǔxīlán.

In general, mainland China tends to preserve the pronunciation of names deriving from their language of origin while Taiwan often transcribes them according to the English pronunciation. For example, the Russian President Vladimir Putin is known as  Pǔjīng in mainland sources after the native Russian pronunciation , whereas the name is rendered as  Pǔdīng in Taiwan. Hong Kong and Macau, meanwhile, formerly transcribed names using their Cantonese pronunciations, although that practice has become less common following their handovers. Chinese transcriptions are now frequently cribbed from the mainland, even if the local pronunciation then becomes more remote from the original. For example, Cantonese sources copy the mainland transcription , despite its local pronunciation being the rather infelicitous Póugīng.

In 2016, a controversy arose in Hong Kong when protestors petitioned Nintendo to reverse its decision of converting the Hong Kong names of over 100 Pokémon into the mainland Chinese equivalents of their names, including its most famous character Pikachu. In the first half of 2016, Nintendo announced that it would change Pikachu's name from its original Cantonese name, Béikāchīu , to Pèikāyāu in favor of fitting the Mandarin pronunciation, Píkǎqiū , in the most recent series of Pokémon games, Pokémon Sun and Moon, in order to standardize marketing in the Greater China region.

Even though Malaysia had their official transliteration names for ministers and currency unit (Malaysian Ringgit), China did not accept those transliterations and proceed to use their own transliterations. For Malay names, transliterations usually uses their pronunciation to transliterate into Chinese characters instead of their appeared romanization (e.g. Xinhua's translation usually transliterate letter by letter instead of following their pronunciation).

Transcription table
The table below is the English-into-Chinese transcription table from Xinhua's Names of the World's Peoples. This table uses the International Phonetic Alphabet for English vowels (rows) and consonants (columns).

Notes
 When vowels ⟨a⟩, ⟨e⟩, ⟨i⟩, ⟨o⟩, and ⟨u⟩ are in an unstressed syllable, generally transcribe them according to their written forms.
 When diphthongs ⟨ai⟩ and ⟨ay⟩ are at the beginning of a word, transcribe them according to the [] row.
 Transcribe [tr] and [dr] as [t] plus [r]- and [d] plus [r]-row characters.
 Transcribe ⟨m⟩ as  when it is before a ⟨b⟩ or ⟨p⟩.
 Generally still transcribe an aspirated unaspirated-consonant or an unaspirated aspirated-consonant according to its written form.
(shown as alternatives above) are used in female names.
  is used at the beginning of a word. (shown as an alternative above)

Exceptions

Translating names
The characters now employed in standardized transcription tend to have abstract or obscure meanings and have fallen out of use, so that their phonetic use is apparent. Therefore, in many cases, the Chinese names non-Chinese people adopt for themselves are not those that are phonetically equivalent but are instead "adapted" from or "inspired" by (i.e., translations of) the original. See, for instance, the Chinese names of the Hong Kong governors.

New characters
Very rarely, characters are specially made for the transcribed terms. This was formerly more common: by adding the appropriate semantic radical, existing characters could be used to give a sense of the sound of the new word. Another such example is  pīngpāng the Chinese word for ping pong, in which both characters are formed by removing a stroke from the similar sounding character  bīng, and at the same time, the two characters look like a net and a paddle. The most general radical for transcription is the mouth radical, which is used to transcribe not only certain foreign terms (such as  kāfēi, "coffee"), but also terms for which no Chinese characters exist in non-Mandarin varieties of Chinese (such as in Cantonese). Such phono-semantic compounds make up the majority of Chinese characters, but new ones coined to communicate foreign words only infrequently reach common use today.

See also 
Sinicization
Chinese Language Standardisation Council of Malaysia
Romanization of Chinese
Cyrillization of Chinese
Ateji, the Japanese equivalent
Place names in China
Chinese exonyms
Chinese characters for transcribing Slavonic, for transcription from Church Slavonic
Jingtang Jiaoyu, for transcribing Arabic to Chinese characters
The Secret History of the Mongols, a surviving document written in Mongolian transcribed to Chinese characters
Official Cantonese translations of English names for British officials

References

Citations

Sources 

 
 Names of the World's Peoples, published by the Xinhua News Agency, October 1993, /Z21

Chinese language
Transcription (linguistics)